Mirantis Inc. is a Campbell, California, based B2B open source cloud computing software and services company. Its primary container and cloud management products, part of the Mirantis Cloud Native Platform suite of products, are Mirantis Container Cloud and Mirantis Kubernetes Engine (formerly Docker Enterprise). The company focuses on the development and support of container and cloud infrastructure management platforms based on Kubernetes and OpenStack. The company was founded in 1999 by Alex Freedland and Boris Renski. It was one of the founding members of the OpenStack Foundation, a non-profit corporate entity established in September, 2012 to promote OpenStack software and its community. Mirantis has been an active member of the Cloud Native Computing Foundation since 2016.

Mirantis, OpenStack and Kubernetes

Mirantis has been a top contributor to the OpenStack project. Mirantis initially specialized in working with clients to build out open private, public, and service-provider cloud platforms based on OpenStack, using open source tools to integrate the computing, network and storage capabilities which define OpenStack infrastructure. The Wall Street Journal characterizes OpenStack as providing "a kind of dashboard to help manage large numbers of servers, storage and networking devices like they were a single resource. Mirantis sells a commercial version and helps customers develop and install the software", and offers managed services for remote operations. Later, the company transitioned to Kubernetes based container and cloud infrastructure platforms, including the Mirantis Cloud Native Platform suite of products, which includes a containerized version of OpenStack.

In two rounds of fund-raising in January and June 2013, Mirantis raised $10 million in funding from Intel Capital and WestSummit Capital, and a further $10 million from Red Hat, Ericsson and Sapphire Ventures. In October 2014, Mirantis raised $100 million in a Series B financing round led by Insight Venture Partners, and joined by existing investors Intel Capital, WestSummit Capital, Telefonaktiebolaget L.M. Ericsson and Sapphire Ventures. In August 2015, Intel led an additional $100 million funding round with new investor Goldman Sachs and existing investors August Capital, Insight Venture Partners, Ericsson, Sapphire Ventures and WestSummit Capital.

OpenStack
Mirantis announced its own OpenStack distribution in October 2013, in competition with distributions from Red Hat, Hewlett-Packard and others. The Mirantis OpenStack distribution works with various operating systems, including Red Hat, CentOS, and Ubuntu Linux.

Other delivery form-factors for Mirantis OpenStack include the Mirantis NFV Reference Platform, a reference architecture for Mirantis OpenStack designed to efficiently host, orchestrate and scale virtualized network functions in ways compatible with the ETSI-NFV specification.

Mirantis Unlocked Appliances, first offered in July 2015, were turn-key, scalable modular racks, with Mirantis OpenStack pre-installed and pre-tested on select hardware in reference configurations optimized for different workload types, sold and supported in collaboration with Mirantis Certified Rack Partners. The first Unlocked Appliance, for Cloud Native Apps, incorporated hardware and software from Dell, Juniper and Intel.

By early 2017, Mirantis changed its focus to offer managed services based on a number of open source infrastructure platforms, including OpenStack.

In October 2019, Mirantis became the official administrator of the Certified OpenStack Administrator program on behalf of the OpenStack Foundation.

In December 2020, Mirantis announced the release of Mirantis OpenStack for Kubernetes, a containerized edition of the open source Infrastructure-as-a-Service platform, as part of its Mirantis Cloud Native Platform.

Kubernetes 
In 2015, Mirantis partnered with Google to integrate Kubernetes and OpenStack, using OpenStack Murano application catalog technology. Mirantis debuted its first Kubernetes-related offering in December 2016, when it introduced vendor-agnostic training and certification for the Kubernetes and Docker container platforms. The company released Mirantis Cloud Platform, which combines OpenStack with Kubernetes and follows a build-operate-transfer delivery model in April 2017. Mirantis Cloud Platform utilizes a continuous integration / continuous delivery toolchain, known as DriveTrain, to perform continuous incremental updates and eliminate the need for major upgrades of the platform.

Mirantis announced Mirantis Cloud Platform Containers-as-a-Service, which enables users to provision Kubernetes clusters across multiple clouds on private infrastructure and/or public clouds including Amazon Web Services, in September 2017. With the addition of Containers-as-a-Service, Mirantis Cloud Platform supports hybrid clouds, with DriveTrain providing “consistent tooling for managing the lifecycle of OpenStack, Kubernetes on-premises and on AWS." As Mirantis continues to shift from an exclusive OpenStack focus to the continuous integration and continuous delivery of Kubernetes and other combinations of open source cloud software, this tooling forms the basis of the company's vision of a “cloud-native continuous delivery” platform for multi-cloud solutions.

Mirantis launched Mirantis Application Platform, a continuous delivery platform for Kubernetes, in April 2018.

Mirantis' edge computing platform, launched in October 2018, is based on Kubernetes and targeted towards telecommunications providers. 

In May 2019, the company announced its "Bring Your Own Distro" initiative, which offers enterprise support for multiple Kubernetes distributions, targeting organizations that have already deployed Kubernetes in production, including many who have been "extending Kubernetes in a way that makes it challenging for IT operations teams to support."

In November 2019, the company acquired the Docker Enterprise business, known for kick-starting the software container movement, to support Mirantis' vision of providing a "cloud native stack, powered by Kubernetes, delivered as a service."

In February 2020, Mirantis announced that it brought on board a team of Kubernetes experts from Kontena, a Finnish company that developed the Pharos distribution of Kubernetes.

In September 2020, Mirantis announced the release of Mirantis Container Cloud (originally known as Docker Enterprise Container Cloud), which provides multi-cloud and multi-cluster management capabilities across public and private clouds.

OpenStack, Kubernetes and other community involvement
Mirantis founders, Alex Freedland (CEO) and Boris Renski (CMO) have served on the OpenStack Foundation Board and Boris Renski was most recently re-elected in January 2018. Mirantis has been a major contributor of code to OpenStack, ranking as the #3 contributor of all time by both commits and lines of code.

Mirantis contributes to many core OpenStack projects and during the Mitaka and Newton releases, when Mirantis ranked as the #1 contributor by lines of code, the company led projects in OpenStack core and Big Tent, including: 
 Fuel, an OpenStack project under Big Tent, is a toolkit for deploying and managing OpenStack clouds. Fuel allows deployment, configuration, and validation of infrastructure features through a graphical interface; it allows users to choose which OpenStack components to run.
 Project Murano, an OpenStack application catalog project developed by Mirantis and other members of the OpenStack community. Murano attempts to address the challenge of installing third party services and applications in a dynamic OpenStack environment by offering a catalog of applications fully defined for automated deployment.
 Sahara, an OpenStack project that simplifies creation of Hadoop clusters, originated by the Apache Software Foundation and OpenStack Foundation members, is contributed to by Mirantis in collaboration with Red Hat and Hortonworks.
 Rally, an OpenStack project that benchmarks performance of OpenStack clouds, is contributed to by Mirantis.
Mirantis was the largest code-contributor to OpenStack Newton by lines of code, with 32% of all lines of code recorded.

By 2016, Mirantis started becoming a significant contributor of code to other open infrastructure-related projects as well, including Kubernetes, Ceph, OpenContrail, Prometheus, and OPNFV.

In 2019, Mirantis announced that it joined Airship, "an open source project for automating the provisioning of clouds, as part of an effort to accelerate deployment of Kubernetes on bare-metal servers that AT&T will employ to drive 5G networking services."

Acquisitions 
In 2016, Mirantis acquired TCP Cloud, a Czech startup that developed managed services for OpenStack.

On Nov 13, 2019, Mirantis acquired Docker (software) Enterprise Technology Platform and all associated IP: Docker Enterprise Engine, Docker Trusted Registry, Docker Unified Control Plane and Docker CLI. 

In August 2020, Mirantis acquired Lens, an open source Integrated Development Environment for Kubernetes, from Kontena, the Finnish company that originally developed Lens. 

In July 2022, Mirantis acquired Amazee.io, developer of Lagoon, an open source application delivery platform for Kubernetes. 

In January 2023, Mirantis acquired Shipa, a company that builds tools to help developers develop, deploy and manage cloud-native applications.

References

Cloud computing providers
Free software companies
Technology companies established in 1999
1999 establishments in California